The 2011 Wales Rally GB, formally the 67th Wales Rally of Great Britain, was the thirteenth and final round of the 2011 World Rally Championship season. The rally took place over 10–13 November, and was based in Cardiff, the capital city of Wales. The rally was also the seventh and final round of the Production World Rally Championship, and the sixth and final round of the WRC Academy. The route returned to the Great Orme stage for the first time in thirty years, as well as the Dyfnant and Dyfi East and West stages for the first time in fifteen years.

Jari-Matti Latvala took his first WRC victory since 2010 Rally Finland, and the fifth of his career, after taking the lead midway through the running on Saturday. With Sébastien Loeb's retirement on Sunday after a collision on a road section, Latvala's eventual winning margin was almost four minutes over Mads Østberg, who matched his best WRC result from Rally Sweden at the beginning of the season. Henning Solberg took his first podium since 2009 Rally Poland after Kris Meeke, who had been challenging Solberg for his first WRC podium, spun on the final stage of the event. Patrik Flodin took the PWRC victory to finish in second place in the class championship, while Craig Breen took the WRC Academy victory, and enough bonus points to win the championship.

Report

WRC Championship
Sébastien Loeb and Mikko Hirvonen headed into the final round of the championship for the second time in three years as the only drivers that could claim the world title. Loeb held the lead of the championship with 222 points, having won Rally Catalunya, the event prior to Rally GB. Hirvonen was eight points in arrears, with a maximum of 28 points possible on the rally including Power Stage bonus points. Ultimately, the championship was decided during Friday's running when Hirvonen hit a tree stump during the first passing of the Dyfnant stage. He was forced to retire from the event after Ford deemed the damage to Hirvonen's Fiesta to be too extensive for him to rejoin. With Hirvonen unable to restart, Loeb claimed his eighth consecutive world title. While running second, 7.5 seconds behind Jari-Matti Latvala, Loeb retired from the event after a head-on collision with a spectator vehicle on the liaison route between the Halfway and Crychan stages on Sunday morning. There were no injuries in the accident.

Support categories
The PWRC title had already been decided prior to the rally, as Hayden Paddon had clinched the title in Australia after four wins from the first four rallies he contested. Paddon did not compete in the class in Great Britain, instead moving to an R4-specification Subaru Impreza. Seven drivers remained within mathematical contention for the runner-up placing, all of whom contested the event. The WRC Academy title was also yet to be decided prior to the rally, with Egon Kaur, Craig Breen and Yeray Lemes the only drivers in contention for the €500,000 scholarship given to the champion. Kaur held a 20-point lead over Breen and a 36-point advantage over Lemes with 42 points on offer. Breen won the event, and with numerous stage wins – including the final five stages – managed to beat Kaur for the championship title, winning it on countback of stage wins.

Results

Event standings

† – The WRC Academy featured the first two days of the rally.

Special stages

Power Stage
The "Power stage" was a live, televised  stage at the end of the rally, held near Builth Wells.

References

External links 
 The official website for the rally
 Results at eWRC.com

Wales
Rally GB
Wales Rally
November 2011 sports events in the United Kingdom